Chlidichthys bibulus, the nosey dottyback, is a species of fish in the family Pseudochromidae.

Description

Distribution and habitat
Chlidichthys bibulus is found in the Indian Ocean from Kenya to Mozambique, to Aldabra Island and including the Socotra Archipelago.

References

Smith, M.M., 1986. Pseudochromidae. p. 539-541. In M.M. Smith and P.C. Heemstra (eds.) Smiths' sea fishes. Springer-Verlag, Berlin.

Pseudoplesiopinae
Taxa named by J. L. B. Smith
Fish described in 1954